Uzziah (‘Uzzīyyāhū, meaning "my strength is Yah";), also known as Azariah (‘Azaryā;), was the tenth king of the ancient Kingdom of Judah, and one of Amaziah's sons. Uzziah was 16 when he became king of Judah and reigned for 52 years. The first 24 years of his reign were as a co-regent with his father, Amaziah.

William F. Albright dates Uzziah's reign to 783–742 BC. Edwin R. Thiele's chronology has Uzziah becoming coregent with his father Amaziah in 792/791 BCE and sole ruler of Judah after his father's death in 768/767 BCE. Uzziah was struck with leprosy for disobeying God. Thiele dates Uzziah's being struck with leprosy to 751/750 BCE, at which time his son Jotham took over the government, with Uzziah living on until 740/739 BCE. Pekah became king of Israel in the last year of Uzziah's reign.

The Gospel of Matthew lists Uzziah in the genealogy of Jesus.

Name
Uzziah is referred to several times in the Hebrew Bible as Azariah. According to Catholic theologian James F. Driscoll, the second form of his name is most likely the result of a copyist's error.

Biblical narrative

Uzziah took the throne at age 16 and reigned for about 52 years. His reign was "the most prosperous excepting that of Jehoshaphat since the time of Solomon." In the earlier part of his reign, under the influence of a prophet named Zechariah, he was faithful to God and "did that which was right in the eyes of the Lord".

In Jerusalem he made machines designed by skillful men for use on the towers and on the corner defenses to shoot arrows and hurl large stones. According to 2 Chronicles 26, Uzziah conquered the Philistines and the Arabians and received tribute from the Ammonites. He fortified the country, organized and equipped the army, and personally engaged in agricultural pursuits. He was a vigorous and able ruler, and "his name spread abroad, even to the entrance of Egypt".

Then his pride led to his downfall. He entered the Temple to burn incense on the altar of incense. Azariah the high priest saw this as an attempt to usurp the prerogatives of the priests and confronted him with a band of eighty priests, saying, "It is not for you, Uzziah, to burn incense to the Lord, but for the priests, the sons of Aaron, who are consecrated to burn incense.". In the meantime a great earthquake shook the ground, and a rent was made in the temple, and the bright rays of the sun shone through it, and fell upon the king's face, insomuch that the leprosy (Hebrew: tzaraath) seized upon him immediately (Josephus Flavius, Antiquities IX 10:4). Uzziah was suddenly struck with leprosy before he had offered the incense, and he was driven from the Temple and compelled to reside in "a separate house" until his death (27). The government was turned over to his son Jotham, a coregency that lasted for the last 11 years of Uzziah's life (751/750 to 740/739 BC).

He was buried in a separate grave "in the field of the burial which belonged to the kings". "That lonely grave in the royal necropolis would eloquently testify to coming generations that all earthly monarchy must bow before the inviolable order of the divine will, and that no interference could be tolerated with that unfolding of the purposes of God..." (Dr. Green's Kingdom of Israel).

Biblical references 
 The Book of Isaiah uses "the year that king Uzziah died" as a reference point for describing the vision in which Isaiah sees the Lord of Hosts.
The Book of Amos dates its words as being received when "Uzziah was king of Judah" (Amos 1.1).
Another Uzziah, a Simeonite, son of Micah, is mentioned as the first of the city magistrates in Bethulia, Judith's town in the apocryphal Book of Judith.

Historicity
Archaeological findings from Mesopotamia — in the form of Assyrian correspondence and administrative texts discovered at Nimrud and sculptures from the royal palaces of Nineveh — indicate close ties between Assyria and Judah between the reigns of Uzziah and Manasseh and are evidence that Uzziah was contemporary with Tiglath-Pileser III. A highly fragmentary portion of Tiglath-Pileser's annals mention the king "Azaria'u" of "Ya'uda", seemingly "Azariah of Judah", which some have stated is a reference to Uzziah; however, the prevailing opinion that Uzziah's mentions as "Azariah" in the Hebrew Bible are the result of a later copyist error casts doubt that the official annals of the Assyrian kingdom would have (or even could have) referred to the king by this name.

Uzziah's name appears in two unprovenanced iconic stone seals discovered in 1858 and 1863. The first is inscribed l’byw ‘bd / ‘zyw, "[belonging] to ’Abiyah, minister of ‘Uziyah", and the second (rev.) lšbnyw ‘ / bd ‘zyw, "[belonging] to Shubnayah, minister of  ‘Uziyah." If genuine, they are the first concrete reference to the ancient king.

In 1931, an archaeological find, known as the Uzziah Tablet was discovered by Professor E.L. Sukenik of the Hebrew University. He came across the artifact in the collection of the Russian Orthodox Eleona convent (Convent of the Ascension) from the Mount of Olives, put together by Byzantologist and cleric, Archimandrite Antonin (Kapustin). The provenance of the tablet previous to this remains unknown and was not documented by the convent. The inscription on the tablet is written in an Aramaic dialect very similar to Biblical Aramaic. According to its script, it is dated to around 30–70 CE, around 700 years after the supposed death of Uzziah of 2 Kings and 2 Chronicles. Nevertheless, the inscription is translated, "Hither were brought the bones of Uzziah, king of Judah. Not to be opened." It is open to debate whether this tablet really was part of the tomb of King Uzziah or simply a later creation. It may be that there was a later reburial of Uzziah during the Second Temple period.

Earthquake in the days of Uzziah

A major earthquake is referred to in the book of the prophet Amos. Amos dates his prophecy to "two years before the earthquake, when Uzziah was king of Judah and Jeroboam son of Jehoash was king of Israel" (Amos 1:1, NIV). Over 200 years later, the prophet Zechariah predicted a future earthquake from which the people would flee as they fled in the days of Uzziah (Zechariah 14:5). Geologists believe they have found evidence of this major earthquake in sites throughout Israel and Jordan. The geologists write:
Masonry walls best display the earthquake, especially walls with broken ashlars, walls with displaced rows of stones, walls still standing but leaning or bowed, and walls collapsed with large sections still lying course-on-course. Debris at six sites (Hazor, Deir 'Alla, Gezer, Lachish, Tell Judeideh, and 'En Haseva) is tightly confined stratigraphically to the middle of the 8th-century B.C., with dating errors of ~30 years... The earthquake was at least magnitude 7.8, but likely was 8.2... This severe geologic disaster has been linked historically to a speech delivered at the city of Bethel by a shepherd-farmer named Amos of Tekoa."

An exact date for this earthquake would be of considerable interest to archaeologists and historians, because it would allow a synchronization of the earthquake at all the sites affected by it in Israel, Jordan, Lebanon and Syria. Currently, the stratigraphic evidence at Gezer dates the earthquake at 760 BC, plus or minus 25 years, while Yadin and Finkelstein date the earthquake level at Hazor to 760 BC based on stratigraphic analysis of the destruction debris. Similarly, Ussishkin dates the "sudden destruction" level at Lachish to approximately 760 BC. A report in 2019 by geologists studying layers of sediment on the floor of the Dead Sea further confirms the occurrence of this particular seismic event.

Amos says that the earthquake was in the days of Uzziah king of Judah and Jeroboam (II), son of Jehoash king of Israel. The reference to Jeroboam II is helpful in restricting the date of Amos' vision, more so than the reference to Uzziah's long reign of 52 years. According to Thiele's widely accepted chronology, Jeroboam II began a coregency with his father in 793/792, became sole regent in 782/781, and died in late summer or the fall of 753 BC. Assuming that the prophecy took place after Uzziah became sole regent in 768/767, Amos' prophecy can be dated to some time after that and some time before Jeroboam's death in 753 BC, with the earthquake two years after that. These dates are consistent with the dates given by the archaeologists above for the earthquake. They are inconsistent with the tradition, found in Josephus and the Talmud but not in the Bible, that the earthquake occurred when Uzziah entered the Temple to offer incense, accepting that the beginning of the Uzziah/Jotham coregency began sometime in the six-month period after Nisan 1 of 750 BC.

Further chronological notes
The calendars for reckoning the years of kings in Judah and Israel were offset by six months, that of Judah starting in Tishri (in the fall) and that of Israel in Nisan (in the spring). Cross-synchronizations between the two kingdoms therefore often allow narrowing of the beginning and/or ending dates of a king to within a six-month range. For Uzziah, the Scriptural data allow the narrowing of the beginning of his sole reign to some time between Nisan 1 of 767 BCE and the day before Tishri 1 of the same year.

Some writers object to the use of coregencies in determining the dates of the kings of Judah and Israel, saying that there should be explicit reference to coregencies if they existed. Since there is no word for "coregency" in Biblical Hebrew, an explicit mention using this word is not found. In the case of Uzziah, however, the statement that after he was stricken with leprosy, his son Jotham had charge of the palace and governed the people of the land is a fairly straightforward indication of what in modern terms is called a coregency. Coregencies are well attested in Egypt, and in giving the year of their reign, the timelines of the pharaohs do not relate whether it is measured from a coregency. Egyptologists must determine the existence of a coregency from a comparison of chronological data, just as Thiele and those who have followed him have done from the chronological data of Scripture. 

Not all of the coregencies for the kings of Judah and Israel are as easy to identify as the Uzziah/Jotham coregency indicated by 2 Kings 15:5, but those who ignore coregencies in constructing the history of this time have failed to produce any chronology for the period that has found widespread acceptance. After noting how David set a pattern by setting his son Solomon on the throne before his death, Nadav Na'man writes, "When taking into account the permanent nature of the co-regency in Judah from the time of Joash, one may dare to conclude that dating the co-regencies accurately is indeed the key for solving the problems of biblical chronology in the eighth century BC"

The dates given in the infobox below are those of Thiele, except the starting date for the Amaziah/Uzziah coregency is taken as one year later than that given by Thiele, following Leslie McFall. This implies that Uzziah's 52 years are to be taken in a non-accession sense, which was Thiele's general practice for coregencies, but which he did not follow in the case of Uzziah.

References

8th-century BC births
8th-century BC Kings of Judah
8th-century BC deaths
Ancient child monarchs